A misdemeanor is a "lesser" criminal act.

Misdemeanor may also refer to: 

High misdemeanor, an archaic term in English Law for a number of positive misprisions, neglects and contempts

Music
Misdemeanor (UFO album), 1985
Misdemeanor (band), a female stoner rock band from Sweden
Misdemeanor (Misdemeanor album), 2002
"Miss Demeanor", a song by Sweet on their album, Desolation Boulevard
Missy "Misdemeanor" Elliott, a female American rapper
"Misdemeanor", a song by soul singer Foster Sylvers

See also
Ms. Demeanor, a cartoon character in the COPS animated TV series
High crimes and misdemeanours, allegations of misconduct that do not fall under a more clearly defined impeachable offence